Cylindera lemniscata, the white-striped tiger beetle, is a species of flashy tiger beetle in the family Carabidae. It is found in Central America and North America.

Subspecies
These three subspecies belong to the species Cylindera lemniscata:
 Cylindera lemniscata bajacalifornica (Shook, 1989)
 Cylindera lemniscata lemniscata (LeConte, 1854)
 Cylindera lemniscata rebaptisata (Vaurie, 1951)

References

Further reading

External links

 

lemniscata
Articles created by Qbugbot
Beetles described in 1854